Dehumanization is the only full-length album by American hardcore punk band Crucifix. Released in 1983, it is regarded as one of the classic anarcho-punk records, as well as an important D-beat record.

The song "Prejudice" was covered live by the American anarcho-punk band Aus-Rotten, and released on their 1997 Not One Single Fucking Hit Discography compilation. "Annihilation" has been covered by the Brazilian metal band Sepultura and the American alternative rock band A Perfect Circle. The Varukers cover "Indo-China."

Track listing
All tracks by Pheng, Borruso, Crucifix, Douglas and Smith. 
 "Annihilation" – 1:29
 "How When Where" – 1:37
 "Skinned Alive" – 0:47
 "Prejudice" – 2:08
 "No Limbs" – 1:36
 "Another Mouth to Feed" – 1:50
 "Search for the Sun" – 1:37
 "Indo-China" – 2:23
 "Three Miles to Oblivion" – 1:02
 "See Through Their Lies" – 1:42
 "Death Toll" – 2:38
 "Blind Destruction" – 1:39
 "Rise and Fall" – 0:43
 "Stop Torture" – 1:53

Credits
 Sothira Pheng - Vocals
 Jake Smith - Guitar
 Matt Borruso - Bass
 Chris Douglas - Drums

References

1983 albums
Crucifix (band) albums